John L. Comaroff (born 1 January 1945) is Professor of African and African American Studies and of Anthropology, Oppenheimer Fellow in African Studies at Harvard University. He is recognised for his study of African and African-American society. Comaroff and his wife, anthropologist Jean Comaroff, have collaborated on publications examining post-colonialism and the Tswana people of South Africa. He has written several texts describing his research and has presented peer-reviewed anthropological theories of African cultures that have relevance to understanding global society. 

Comaroff was placed on paid administrative leave from his position at Harvard in August 2020 following allegations of sexual harassment and later placed on unpaid leave in January 2022. He has resumed teaching since September 2022.

Early life and education

Comaroff was born in Cape Town, South Africa, the only child of Jane Miller Comaroff and Louis (sometimes known as Lionel) Comaroff. His father's family was from Ukraine: his grandfather migrated in the early 1890s from Ukraine to England, and his father, Louis, was born in Rhodesia. Comaroff's mother's family migrated to South Africa from Lithuania in the early 1900s.

Comaroff was the first person in his family to attend University. He attended the University of Cape Town, where he developed his interest in anthropology. In his second year at the university, he met his classmate and future wife, Jean. They completed their bachelor's degrees and part of their Honors year at the University of Cape Town. The second part of their Honors year was completed at the London School of Economics.

Career
Comaroff has conducted most of his field research in South Africa. From 1969 to 1970 he spent 19 months studying society, culture, politics, and law among the Barolong boo Ratshidi, part of the Tswana chiefdoms along the South Africa-Botswana Borderland. From 1972 to 1973, he went back to the Mafeking District, of the Barolong boo Ratshidi, for supplementary research on society and culture for filming Heal the Whole Man, which looks at healing and other religious practices of the Barolong boo Ratshidi. He then focused his research on the social and cultural aspects of economic development of the Barolong in Botswana for 15 months in 1974 and 1975. From 1977 to 1978 for three months, he focused on this group again but looked at the rise of agrarian capitalism. During the summers of 1990–1998, Comaroff returned to South Africa to conduct research in various places such as Bophuthatswana, better known as the North West Province. From 1999 to 2001, he again studied in the North West Province, looking at occult-related violence. He researched this topic for 15 months. Then from 2002 to 2001, he studied crime and policing in this area. During 2005–2010 he researched the Tswana and San people and how ethnic identity and cultural property are becoming commoditised.

Comaroff joined the American Bar Foundation in 1991 as a research fellow until 2012. In 2012, he and Jean Comaroff took teaching positions at Harvard University. He is no longer an affiliated scholar at the American Bar Foundation. 

Since 2009, Comaroff has worked on the project Ethnicity Inc., follow-up research being conducted in connection with the Comaroffs' book Ethnicity Inc. The project focuses on why ethnic groups have become increasingly like corporations, why culture has become more like intellectual property, and what about the contemporary world has made it that way.

The Comaroffs published a book, Theory from the South, based on research conducted in South Africa.

John and Jean Comaroff spent 34 years teaching at the University of Chicago.

Research interests
Witchcraft has been a topic of interest for the Comaroffs since 1969. The Comaroffs became particularly interested in this phenomenon after they returned to South Africa in the 1990s, shortly after apartheid had ended in South Africa.

Global capitalism also serves as a topic of interest for both Comaroffs. They published Ethnicity Inc. (2009), which focuses specifically on the topic of global capitalism. They have also expressed an interest in the concept of lawfare, specifically how the law has been used to inflict violence indirectly by using the law to benefit oneself at the expense of others. This concept is used in their book Law and Disorder in the Postcolony (2006) in an analytical sense.

In their book, Of Revelation and Revolution, the Comaroffs look closely at hegemony. Their definition states, "We take hegemony to refer to that order of signs and practices, relations and distinctions, images and epistemologies – drawn from a historically situated cultural field – that come to be taken for granted for as the natural and received shape of the world"(Comaroff, 1991).

Comaroff has also been a lecturer in social anthropology at the University of Wales (1971–1972), University College of Swansea (1971–1972), and the University of Manchester (1972–1978). He was also a visiting professor at the University of California Riverside (1981–1982), Duke University (1989), Tel Aviv University (2000), University of Basel (2005), and the University of Vienna (2007). Additionally, Comaroff was an Honorary Senior Fellow at the University of Manchester in the International Centre for Contemporary Cultural Research (1994–1995) and in the Department of Social Anthropology (1996–1998). In 1988 and 1995 he was an Associate Director of Studies in Paris. Furthermore, Comaroff was a visiting scholar at the Center for Modern Oriental Studies in Berlin (1998) and a visiting fellow at the Stellenbosch Institute for Advance Study in South Africa (2010 and 2011). Since 2004, John Comaroff has been an Honorary Professor at the University of Cape Town.

Sexual harassment allegations
A May 2020 investigation by The Harvard Crimson determined that several students had raised concerns with the university's Title IX office, making allegations of "unwanted touching, verbal sexual harassment, and professional retaliation" against Comaroff. University administrators initially placed Comaroff on "paid administrative leave" in August 2020 amid a review of the allegations.

The investigation concluded in January 2022, and based on the findings, Harvard placed Comaroff on unpaid leave. The investigation did not substantiate the allegations of "unwanted sexual contact", but found Comaroff responsible for "verbal sexual harassment". According to Comaroff's legal team, Comaroff had claimed to an LGBT student planning to conduct fieldwork in Africa that she "would be raped". His legal team argued that this was a mere ethical warning that was misconstrued as sexual harassment and characterized Harvard's investigation as a "kangaroo court process". In support of Comaroff, 38 Harvard scholars signed an open letter condemning the sanctions and review process. 73 other Harvard faculty reacted to the letter with another open letter, criticizing their colleagues for defending Comaroff too quickly without knowing the details of the internal investigation.

On February 8, 2022, three students initiated a lawsuit against Harvard University, challenging the results of the Title IX investigation and claiming that Harvard had failed to respond to years of sexual harassment allegations against Comaroff. They also claimed that Comaroff had "threatened retaliation against them". One student detailed in the lawsuit the alleged nature of the verbal sexual harassment, claiming that Comaroff had, with a "tone of enjoyment", described how she might be forced into "corrective rape". The student alleged that this was only part of a broader pattern of physical sexual harassment, of which Harvard's investigation failed to find sufficient evidence.

As the details of the lawsuit came out, many Harvard scholars who had signed the original letter in support of Comaroff retracted their signatures. As of February 9, 35 of the original 38 professors had retracted their signatures, and released a statement admitting they "were lacking full information about the case" and that they agreed with the counter-letter.

After Comaroff returned from administrative leave, on September 6, 2022, students walked out of his classroom before the first lecture of the semester was to begin. The Harvard Graduate Students Union then staged a protest outside the building, criticizing Harvard's decision to not fire Comaroff. They also circulated a petition demanding that Harvard be more transparent about how it conducted sexual harassment investigations and decided upon sanctions. Comaroff faced a similar walkout and protest at his first class of January 2023.

Awards
 Oppenheimer Research Scholar at Harvard University in Cambridge, MA.

Bibliography
 Comaroff, J. & Comaroff J. (1991). Of Revelation and Revolution Volume 1: Christianity, Colonialism, and Consciousness in South Africa. Illinois, Chicago: University of Chicago Press.
 Comaroff, J., & Comaroff, J. (2006). Law and Disorder in the Postcolony. Illinois, Chicago: University of Chicago Press.
 Comaroff, J., & Comaroff, J. (2009). Ethnicity Inc. Illinois, Chicago: University of Chicago Press.
 Comaroff, J., & Comaroff, J. (2011). Theory from the South: Or, How Euro-America is Evolving Toward Africa. Colorado, Boulder: Paradigm.
 Comaroff, John L., & Roberts, S. (1986). Rules and Processes: The Cultural Logic of Dispute in an African Context. Illinois, Chicago: University of Chicago Press.
 Comaroff, J., Comaroff, J., & James, D. (2007). Picturing a Colonial Past: The African Photographs of Isaac Schapera. Illinois, Chicago: University of Chicago Press.

Notes

External links
 Harvard bio
 John L. Comaroff author site 

Alumni of the London School of Economics
University of Chicago faculty
South African anthropologists
University of Cape Town alumni
1945 births
Living people
South African academics
People from Cape Town
Harvard University faculty